The year 1819 in science and technology involved some significant events, listed below.

Astronomy and space science
 Johann Franz Encke computes the orbit of Comet Encke, identifying it as periodic.
 July 1 – Johann Georg Tralles discovers the Great Comet of 1819, (C/1819 N1). It is the first comet analyzed using polarimetry, by François Arago.

Chemistry
 Joseph Bienaimé Caventou and Pierre Joseph Pelletier isolate the alkaloid brucine from Strychnos nux-vomica.

Exploration
 February 19 – Captain William Smith in British merchant brig Williams sights Williams Point, the northeast extremity of Livingston Island in the South Shetlands, the first land discovered south of latitude 60° S.
 October 15 – Desolation Island in the South Shetland Islands of the Antarctic is discovered by Captain William Smith in the Williams.
 A British Arctic expedition under William Edward Parry comprising HMS Hecla and HMS Griper reaches longitude 112°51' W in the Northwest Passage, the furthest west which will be attained by any single-season voyage for 150 years.

Geology
 G. B. Greenough publishes his book A critical examination of the first principles of geology in a series of essays in London.

Medicine
 August – René Laennec publishes De l’Auscultation Médiate ou Traité du Diagnostic des Maladies des Poumons et du Coeur in Paris, describing his invention of the stethoscope.
 English physician John Bostock publishes the first account of allergic rhinitis (in himself).
 French physician Pierre Amable Jean-Baptiste Trannoy publishes one of the first epidemiology treatises in France: Traité élémentaire des maladies épidémiques ou populaires à l'usage des officiers de santé (Elementary Treatise on Epidemic or Popular Diseases for the use of health officers).

Technology
 May 22 –  leaves port at Savannah, Georgia on a voyage to become the first steamship to cross the Atlantic Ocean, although only a fraction of the trip is made under steam. The ship arrives at  Liverpool, England, on June 20.
 Invention of the M1819 breech-loading flintlock using interchangeable parts by Captain John H. Hall of Harpers Ferry Armory in the United States.

Institutions
 Cambridge Philosophical Society founded as a scientific society at the University of Cambridge in England.

Awards
 Copley Medal: Not awarded

Births
 March 24 – Friedrich Theodor von Frerichs (died 1885), German medical pathologist.
 May 3 (O.S. April 21) – Nikolai Annenkov (died 1889), Russian botanist.
 June 5 – John Couch Adams (died 1892), Cornish-born mathematician and astronomer.
 July 17 – Eunice Newton Foote (died 1888), American physicist and women's rights campaigner.
 July 28 – Thomas Evans Blackwell (died 1863), English civil and hydraulic engineer.
 August 9 – William T. G. Morton (died 1868), American dentist.
 August 13 – George Gabriel Stokes (died 1903), Irish-born mathematician and physicist.
 September 18 – Léon Foucault (died 1868), French physicist.
 September 23 – Hippolyte Fizeau (died 1896), French physicist.

Deaths
 January – Elsa Beata Bunge (born 1734), Swedish botanist.
 August 19 – James Watt (born 1736), British inventor, mechanical engineer and mathematician.
 November 22 – John Stackhouse (born 1742), English botanist.

References

 
19th century in science
1810s in science